Egbert Fernandes (25 June 1941 – 6 November 2014) was a Kenyan field hockey player. He competed at the 1960 Summer Olympics, the 1964 and the 1968 Summer Olympics. He is the brother of Kenyan hockey international Edgar Fernandes.

References

External links
 

1941 births
2014 deaths
Kenyan male field hockey players
Olympic field hockey players of Kenya
Field hockey players at the 1960 Summer Olympics
Field hockey players at the 1964 Summer Olympics
Field hockey players at the 1968 Summer Olympics
People from Kisumu County
Kenyan people of Indian descent
Kenyan people of Goan descent
Kenyan emigrants to Australia
Australian people of Indian descent
Australian people of Goan descent
20th-century Kenyan people